The Chile Sevens, also known as the Santiago Sevens, was an international rugby sevens tournament played in Santiago that counted as a leg of the IRB Sevens World Series in the 2001–02 season. It was held at Estadio San Carlos de Apoquindo in Las Condes.

Event winners

References

Former World Rugby Sevens Series tournaments
Rugby union in Chile
Rugby sevens competitions in South America